Craigston Castle is a 17th-century country house located about  north-east of Turriff, Aberdeenshire, Scotland, and is an historic home of the Urquhart family. The U-plan castle is composed of two main wings flanking the entrance and connected by an elevated arch, and surmounted by a richly corbelled parapet. There are bases for corner turrets near the top corner of each wing, but the turrets themselves do not appear to have ever been completed. The wood carvings in the drawing room depict biblical themes and Clan Urquhart heraldic artefacts.

Craigston Castle belongs to the "Bell group" of Scottish castles, designed by masons of the Bell or Bel family, and which, according to H. Gordon Slade, "together form perhaps Scotland’s finest and the most distinctive contribution to Western architecture". The castle is still owned and lived in by the Urquhart family, who trace their descent back to Adam Urquhart, 14th-century sheriff of Cromarty, although according to Sir Thomas Urquhart, translator of Rabelais, the family can be traced back to Adam and Eve through "Termuth", who he states found Moses in the rushes, as well as many other fantastic ancestors.

John Urquhart of Craigfintry (1547-1631), known as the "Tutor of Cromarty", built the castle from 1604 to 1607, and the design of the castle appears to show his influence as compared with other examples of the "Bell group". It was sold by the Urquharts in 1657, but bought back in 1739 by Captain John Urquhart, known as "the pirate", great-grandson of the builder. The new owner built the flanking wings, and laid out new gardens, though apparently not to the designs prepared in 1733 by William Adam, the foremost architect of the time. In the 1830s John Smith, the architect of Balmoral Castle, prepared designs for an extensive remodelling, though only a new entrance doorway was built. Craigston Castle is now a category A listed building. The Urquhart family retain possession of the castle, and have recently started to host weddings and other events, as well as letting it out as accommodation.

References

External links
Craigston Castle - Official website
Craigston castle, Scottish Places

Houses in Aberdeenshire
Castles in Aberdeenshire
Category A listed buildings in Aberdeenshire
Listed castles in Scotland
Tower houses in Scotland
Houses completed in 1607